The Lucy Glacier is a wide glacier which flows southeast from the Antarctic polar plateau, between Laird Plateau and McKay Cliffs, into Nimrod Glacier. It is named after W.R. Lucy, surveyor with 1963-64 Scott Base projects, who wintered over in 1964, and was surveyor with the 1964-65 Geologists Range field party of the New Zealand Geological Survey Antarctic Expedition (NZGSAE).

On December 31, 1993, a ski-equipped Hercules (LC-130) aircraft crashed on Lucy Glacier, near Mount Isbell.  The aircraft was retrieving a group from the University of Wisconsin–Milwaukee who had spent six weeks investigating the geology in the mountains between the Byrd Glacier and Nimrod Glacier. The group consisted of Gina Seegers-Szablewski, Greg Gelhar, mountaineer Shaun Norman (New Zealand), and John Isbell.

See also
 List of glaciers in the Antarctic

References

Glaciers of Shackleton Coast